Tiagba is a village in southern Ivory Coast, on the north shore of Ébrié Lagoon. It is in the sub-prefecture of Jacqueville, Jacqueville Department, Grands-Ponts Region, Lagunes District. The village is known for its traditional houses built on stilts.

Tiagba was a commune until March 2012, when it became one of 1126 communes nationwide that were abolished.

Tourism
Tiagba is popular with tourists. The village affords such activities as pirogue (canoe) rides and staying nights in the old houses that stand on the lakeside on stilts.

Notes

Populated places in Lagunes District
Former communes of Ivory Coast
Tourist attractions in Ivory Coast
Populated places in Grands-Ponts